Kukvaz is a rural locality (a selo) in Asharsky Selsoviet, Kurakhsky District, Republic of Dagestan, Russia. The population was 182 as of 2010. There are 3 streets.

Geography 
Kukvaz is located 8 km northwest of Kurakh (the district's administrative centre) by road. Ashar and Kurakh are the nearest rural localities.

Nationalities 
Lezgins live there.

References 

Rural localities in Kurakhsky District